Tito Wilson is an Indian actor who appears in Malayalam films. He made his debut in the 2017 film Angamaly Diaries in which he played the role of U-Clamp Rajan.

Personal life 
Tito Wilson was born in Thrissur District of Kerala, India to a middle class family. Growing up he always wanted to become an actor. Coming from a middle class family, he realized his path to becoming an actor should start from learning acting and thus he joined a Drama School.

Career 
While attending drama school, Wilson had given many auditions for movies, but none of them came through. During the final stage of school, he gave an audition for a role in the movie Angamaly Diaries. After giving the audition to Chemban Vinod Jose, the writer and Lijo Jose Pellissery, the director of the movie, he was selected to play the role of U-Clamp Rajan, a villainous character, along with Appani Sarath. He was one of the 86 actors who debuted in that movie. He received several accolades for his natural acting while playing U-Clamp Rajan.

Wilson did his second movie in 2017 called Pokkiri Simon directed by Jijo Antony and in the same year he appeared in a movie Swathandriam Ardharathriyil, an action thriller directed by Tinu Pappachan. He played the character of Udayan, a jail inmate.

He also acted in a movie called Maradona (2018 film) alongside actor Tovino Thomas who plays the lead role, directed by Vishnu Narayan.

His first project as the lead role would be in the movie Aaliyante Radio.

Apart from doing movies, Wilson has also appeared in many stage and talk shows including Comedy Super Nite 3 on Flowers (TV channel) and John Brittas Show on Kairali TV.

Filmography

References

External links 
 Tito Wilson on Facebook
 Tito Wilson on IMDb

21st-century Indian male actors
Living people
Male actors from Thrissur
Year of birth missing (living people)
Indian male film actors